Julia Kent is a Canadian cellist and composer from Vancouver, Canada, and based in New York City, United States. She has performed as a member of Rasputina and with Antony and the Johnsons.

Musical career
Kent creates music using looped cello, found sounds, and electronics. In 2007, she released her first solo album, Delay, on Important Records. An EP, Last Day in July, was released in 2010, and a second full-length record, Green and Grey, in 2011, on Tin Angel.

In 2013 Kent moved to The Leaf Label, releasing her third solo album, Character, in March. Her album Asperities was released on Leaf on 30 October 2015. Kent spoke about the album in an interview, saying "I was thinking about the concept of difficulty. Whether in life or in nature—of conflict, of being troubled. The idea of friction. Also in geology, an asperity is some part of a faultline that doesn't move which can create an earthquake, which is quite an evocative concept ... In the music there is an inherent sense of dissonance; that things are too close for comfort. More generally, it seems like a particularly dark time in the world right now, and I think that definitely had an influence too".

Her composition "Dorval" was used in the 2008 film Trinidad, and in an episode of National Public Radio's Radiolab.

In 2011, her composition "Gardermoen," from Delay, was used in Paolo Sorrentino's movie This Must Be the Place.

She composed music for the Canadian documentary film The Boxing Girls of Kabul, the short film Birthplace, A Short History of Decay, and Oasis, which won Best Short Film at the Seville European Film Festival 2015.

She has also composed and performed music for theatre and dance, including productions by the Italian company Balletto Civile.

As a solo artist, she has appeared at Primavera Sound in Barcelona, Spain, the Meltdown festival in London, England, the Reeperbahn Festival in Hamburg, the CTM Festival in Berlin, Germany, the 24-Hour Drone in Hudson, New York, and the Unsound Festival in New York City.

Discography

Solo work
2007 – Delay – Important Records
2010 – Last Day in July – Lento
2011 – Green and Grey – Tin Angel
2013 – Character – The Leaf Label
2015 – Asperities – The Leaf Label
2019 – Temporal – The Leaf Label

Film/TV scores
2012 – The Boxing Girls of Kabul – composer
2013 – A Short History of Decay – composer
2013 – Birthplace – composer
2014 – Oasis – composer
2019 – Twice Upon a Time – composer
2021 – Mrs D – composer
2021 – Stories From the Sea – composer

Work with Antony and the Johnsons
2005 – I Am a Bird Now – cello, string arrangement
2009 – The Crying Light – cello, string arrangement

Work with Rasputina
1996 – Thanks for the Ether – cello
1998 – How We Quit the Forest – cello, string arrangement

References

External links

Julia Kent on The Leaf Label

Julia Kent on Pitchfork
Julia Kent Discogs

Year of birth missing (living people)
Living people
Place of birth missing (living people)
Canadian cellists
Rasputina (band) members
Musicians from Vancouver
Women cellists
Antony and the Johnsons members